At the 2013 National Games of China, the athletics events were held at the Crystal Crown in Shenyang, People's Republic of China from 7–11 September, 2013. The walks and marathon events were held in May, prior to the main track and field competitions.

Nine games records were equalled or bettered during the course of the five-day competition. In addition to those marks, Li Ling set an Asian record of 4.65 metres in the women's pole vault and Zhang Peimeng broke the Chinese record in the men's 200 metres with his run of 20.47 seconds. Zhang broke both games records in the short sprints. Li Jinzhe ranked fourth in the world that year with his games record of 8.34 m in the men's long jump. Zhao Qinggang's record of 83.14 m in the men's javelin throw was over seven metres clear of the rest of the field. The women's side of that event was closer, but Li Lingwei's winning mark of 63.06 m was a games record and made her eleventh best in the world for 2013.

Three of China's four medallists from the 2013 World Championships in Athletics were present. Women's throws bronze medallists Zhang Wenxiu (hammer throw) and Gong Lijiao (shot put) won their respective events over the reigning Asian Champions (Wang Zheng and Liu Xiangrong). Liu Hong was runner-up to Li Xiuzhi in the 20 kilometres walk, with Li being declared the winner in a rare photo-finish for the long-distance race. Asian champion Cao Shuo defeated Dong Bin in the men's triple jump with a clearance of 17.26 m – a mark which ranked him eighth overall that season. Zhao Jing emerged as the nation's top women's middle-distance runner by taking both the 800 metres and 1500 metres titles.

Jiangsu was the best performing team in the medal table, taking seven gold medals and seventeen medals overall. Shandong equalled that haul, but had six golds. The hosts Liaoning had the largest total, with 18 medals, although only two of these were gold. Guangdong, Shanghai and Beijing each took four golds in the athletics competition. Twenty-eight teams reached the medal table.

Medal summary

Men

 The games of the men's 800 metres and 5000 metres were not held due to China's poor performance in these events.

Women

Medal table

References

Results
田径 . Liaoning2013. Retrieved on 2013-09-17.
Athletics results at China's National Games. Xinhua (2013-09-09). Retrieved on 2013-09-19.

External links
Official website of the Games 

2013 National Games of China
2013
Chinese Games